Bloedverwanten (Blood Relations) is a 1977 Dutch comedy film directed by Wim Lindner.

Cast
Sophie Deschamps	... 	Maria
Maxim Hamel	... 	Dr. Julius Steiger
Ralph Arliss... 	Peter Steiger
Grégoire Aslan	... 	Rudolphe De Guys
Eric Beekes... 	Jason
Ronnie Bierman... 	Olive
Eddie Constantine	... 	Priest
Robert Dalban	... 	Mr. Zandvoort
Frits Emmerik	... 	Vampire
Simone Ettekoven	... 	Lydia Martin
Jacqueline Huet	... 	Sister
Wim Kouwenhoven	... 	Claude Martin
Huib Rooymans	... 	Hugo
Will Van Selst	... 	Dr. Liedke
Elly Van Stekelenburg	... 	Gertrud Cornelius

External links 
 

1977 films
1977 comedy films
Dutch comedy films
1970s Dutch-language films